Arturo Varvelli (Turin, 1976) is an Italian researcher at ISPI (Italian Institute for International Political Studies).

Biography
He graduated in Political Science at the University of Milan. In 2006 he earned a PhD in International History at the University of Milan, where he worked also as a lecturer in History of International Relations. In 2007, he began his career as post-doctoral fellow at CRT Foundation in Turin.

He is expert on Italian-Libyan relations, Libyan domestic and foreign politics, and Italian foreign policy in the Mediterranean region and he published three books on these issues (“Dopo Gheddafi. Democrazia e petrolio nella nuova Libia”, with Gerardo Pelosi, Fazi Ed., 2012; “Libia: nascita e fine di una nazione?”, with Karim Mezran, Donzelli, March 2012; "L'Italia e l'ascesa di Gheddafi. La cacciata degli italiani, le armi e il petrolio (1969–1974), Baldini Castoldi Dalai, 2009).

Currently, he is editor in chief of some ISPI on-line publications providing scenarios on international politics. He is also member of the international networks “ArabTrans – Political and Social Transformations in the Arab World” and “GR:EEN - Global re-ordering”, large-scale integrated FP7 research projects funded by the European Commission. He also takes part into research projects commissioned by research office of the Italian Chamber of Representatives and Senate as well as the Italian Ministry of Foreign Affairs.

External links 
ISPI (Italian Institute for International Political Studies)

Italian political scientists
1976 births
Living people
University of Milan alumni
Writers from Turin